Shiadeh Sadat Mahalleh (also Romanized as Shīādeh Sādāt Maḩalleh, Sheyādeh Sādāt Maḩalleh, and Shīā Deh Sādāt Maḩalleh; also known as Shīā Deh) is a village in Khvosh Rud Rural District, Bandpey-ye Gharbi District, Babol County, Mazandaran Province, Iran. At the 2006 census, its population was 372, in 97 families.

References 

Populated places in Babol County